is a train station on the JR West Onoda Line in San'yō-Onoda, Yamaguchi Prefecture, Japan.

Station layout
The station consists of one side platform serving one track. There is no station building, but there is a small shelter near the platform. The station is unattended.

History
The station opened on 1 June, 1957.

References

External links

  

Railway stations in Yamaguchi Prefecture